The Springfield Model 1822 was a .69 caliber flintlock musket manufactured by the United States in the early 19th century.

The Model 1822 was an improvement to the Springfield Model 1816. Some documents refer to the Model 1822 as its own separate model, but other documents refer to it as a variant of the Model 1816 designated as the Type II.

One of the most noticeable differences in the Model 1822 is the attachment of the lower sling swivel. The forward part of the trigger guard was provided with an enlargement which was drilled to receive the sling swivel rivet. Previously, the sling swivel had been affixed to a stud in front of the trigger guard.

In addition to the Springfield and Harpers Ferry armories, the Model 1822 was produced by numerous other independent contractors. It was eventually replaced by the Springfield Model 1835, which is also considered by many to be a continuation of the Model 1816 designated as the Type III.

Like other flintlocks, many of the Model 1822 muskets were converted to percussion lock in the 1840s and 1850s, as percussion caps were more reliable and weather resistant than flintlocks. However, during the Mexico City campaign, General Winfield Scott insisted on his army being equipped with flintlock muskets because flints were easy to make or procure, important in a hostile country where supply lines were vulnerable.

Some Model 1822 muskets also had their barrels rifled so that they could fire the newly invented Minié ball if the barrel was thick enough and structurally sound. However, the increase in breech pressure created by the new expanding bullet was too much for the conversion process and older musket barrels to contain and rifled Model 1822 muskets were issued instead with standard .69 caliber round balls.

The Model 1822 was used in both the Mexican–American War and the American Civil War. During the latter, .69 caliber muskets (mostly percussion, but some flintlocks as well) were common in the early part of the war (either in their original form or converted to rifling). They had totally disappeared from the Army of the Potomac by the second half of 1862 (aside from the Irish Brigade, which carried Springfield Model 1842 muskets until 1864), but the less-well equipped Confederate Army used them for longer, and the Army of Northern Virginia's ordnance chief claimed that Gettysburg was the first battle in which the army was completely free of smoothbore muskets. 

In the Western Theater, the situation was worse for both sides and smoothbores remained in use in the Union armies into 1863. Some Confederate regiments were still carrying .69 caliber muskets at the Battle of Franklin in November 1864.

See also
 Springfield musket

References

External links

Springfield firearms
Muskets
American Civil War weapons
Weapons of the Confederate States of America